"Any Day Above Ground" is the second single from Australian rock musician James Reyne's third studio album Electric Digger Dandy released in July 1991. The album Electric Digger Dandy was released in America under the title Any Day Above Ground.

Track listings
CD single and 7" (VOZCD114SP)
 "Any Day Above Ground" (Album Mix)
 "Any Day Above Ground" (7" Mix)
 "Ferris Wheel"

CD Maxi
 "Any Day Above Ground" (Album Mix) – 3:41
 "Fall of Rome" recorded live at The Palais, Melbourne, Australia, July 12, 1991) – 5:58
 "One More River" (recorded live at The Palais, Melbourne, Australia, July 12, 1991) – 4:55
 "Ferris Wheel" – 4:09

Charts

References

External links

1991 songs
1991 singles
Virgin Records singles
James Reyne songs
Songs written by James Reyne